The Garrard was an English automobile manufactured only in 1904 by Garrard Co. of Birmingham run by Charles Garrard.  

In 1900 Garrard Co. was chiefly devoted to the manufacture of cycle chains and cycle wheel gearing. manufactured From the company which produced the Clément-Garrard motorcycle, it was described as a "Suspended Tri-car".

See also
 Garrard & Blumfield
 List of car manufacturers of the United Kingdom

References

David Burgess Wise, The New Illustrated Encyclopedia of Automobiles

Defunct motor vehicle manufacturers of England
Defunct companies based in Birmingham, West Midlands